The Harbin–Dalian high-speed train are high-speed train services between Harbin, the capital of Heilongjiang Province, and Dalian, a major city in Liaoning Province. The trains are operated by the CR Harbin and CR Shenyang.

History
The high-speed train services between Harbin and Dalian were commenced on 21 April 2013, with the inauguration of the Harbin–Dalian HSR.

At the initial stage, the timetables of the services were different in summer and winter due to climate factors. The summer timetable was effective from 21 April to 30 November, during which the G-series trains with a higher speed were operated. From 1 December 2015, the services have been using one timetable. Trains are operated at a speed of  throughout the year.

Rolling stocks
The CRH380BG EMUs are operated on the services.

See also
Asia Express

References 

China Railway passenger services
Passenger rail transport in China
Rail transport in Liaoning
Rail transport in Heilongjiang